In Assam, north India, gayan-bayan (gāyan-bāyan) is a religious dance performed by disciples of Sankardev in satras.

The phrase gāyan-bāyan comes from gāyan (‘singer’) and bāyan (‘drummer’). The drums used by the bayan are mainly khols and cymbals are used.
 
The Gayan bayan may differ according to the different Satras and sects.

See also

References 

Bhakti movement
Cultural history of Assam
Vaishnavism